Retiro Airport  is an airstrip serving Retiro in the Beni Department of Bolivia.

See also

Transport in Bolivia
List of airports in Bolivia

References

External links 
OpenStreetMap - Retiro
OurAirports - Retiro

Airports in Beni Department